David Vaughn may refer to:

David Vaughn Jr., American basketball player of the 1970s
David Vaughn III, American basketball player of the 1990s

See also
David Vaughan (disambiguation)